The Cabinet of Malaysia has had 18 female cabinet ministers. 32 female deputy ministers and 14 female parliamentary secretaries has had assist the Ministers.

Ministers

Deputy ministers

Parliamentary secretaries

See also
 List of the first female holders of political offices in Asia

References

Cabinet of Malaysia
Lis

Malaysia

Ministers